The 1928 United States Senate elections were elections that coincided with the presidential election of Republican Herbert Hoover. The 32 seats of Class 1 were contested in regular elections, and special elections were held to fill vacancies. The strong economy helped the Republicans to gain seven seats from the Democrats.

Senate Majority leader, Republican Charles Curtis of Kansas, was not up for election this cycle, but he was elected U.S. Vice President. He resigned March 3, 1929, so his seat was vacant at the beginning of the next Congress (March 4, 1929) until April 1, 1929, when a Republican was appointed to continue the term.

Gains, losses, and holds

Retirements
Two Republicans and one Democrat retired instead of seeking re-election.

Defeats
Seven Democrats sought re-election but lost in the primary or general election.

Disqualification
One Republican was elected in 1926, but disqualified from taking office. He resigned on February 9, 1928, and the seat was filled in the 1928 election.

Change in composition

Before the elections 
At the beginning of 1928.

Elections result

Race summary

Special elections during the 70th Congress 
In these special elections, the winner were seated during 1928; ordered by election date.

Elections leading to the 71st Congress 
In these general elections, the winners were elected for the term beginning March 4, 1929; ordered by state.

All of the elections involved the Class 1 seats, unless otherwise indicated.

Closest races 
Twelve races had a margin of victory under 10%:

New Mexico was the tipping point state with a margin of 15.4%.

Arizona

California

Connecticut

Delaware

Florida

Idaho (special)

Illinois (special)

Indiana

Maine

Maryland

Massachusetts

Michigan 

First-term Democrat Woodbridge N. Ferris died March 23, 1928.

On March 31, 1928, Governor Fred W. Green appointed 44-year-old Republican Arthur H. Vandenberg to fill the vacancy, pending a special election. Green considered resigning so he could be appointed to the vacancy. He also considered several other candidates, including former governors Albert Sleeper and Chase Osborn. In addition, Green considered Representative Joseph W. Fordney, who would have been a placeholder until the election for the remainder of Ferris' term. Green finally decided upon Vandenberg, who immediately declared his intention to stand for election to both the short, unexpired term and the full six-year term.  Both the special and the general elections were held the same day, November 6, 1928.

Michigan (regular)

Michigan (special)

Minnesota

Mississippi

Missouri

Montana

Nebraska

Nevada

New Jersey

New Mexico 

Two-term Democrat Andrieus A. Jones died December 20, 1927.  Republican Bronson M. Cutting was appointed December 29, 1927, to continue the term, pending a special election in which he was not a candidate.

New Mexico (special) 

Larrazolo was not a candidate, however, for the next term.  After leaving office, Larrazolo died on April 7, 1930.

New Mexico (regular) 

Cutting would be re-elected in 1934 but died May 6, 1935.

New York

North Dakota

Ohio 

There were 2 elections due to the March 30, 1928, death of Republican Frank B. Willis.

Ohio (regular)

Ohio (special) 

Democrat Cyrus Locher was appointed April 5, 1928, to continue the term, pending the special election, in which he lost his party's nomination.

Burton, in turn, died October 28, 1929, triggering another interim appointment and special election before the 1933 end of the term.

Pennsylvania 

|-
|-bgcolor="#EEEEEE"
| colspan="3" align="right" | Totals
| align="right" | 3,026,864
| align="right" | 100.00%
| align="right" | 
|}

Rhode Island

Tennessee

Texas

Utah

Vermont

Virginia

Washington

West Virginia

Wisconsin

Wyoming

See also
 1928 United States elections
 1928 United States presidential election
 1928 United States House of Representatives elections
 70th United States Congress
 71st United States Congress

Notes

References